Chad Ward (born January 12, 1977)  is a former American football player. He was an offensive guard in the National Football League (NFL). He was drafted in the sixth round of the 2001 NFL Draft.

College career
After completing high school, Ward played college football for the University of Washington.

Notes

1977 births
Living people
American football offensive guards
Jacksonville Jaguars players
People from Kennewick, Washington
Players of American football from Washington (state)
San Francisco 49ers players
Scottish Claymores players
Washington Huskies football players